Piccolo ragazzo is an Italian album by Dalida. It shares some songs with the previous 1966's Pensiamoci Ogni Sera and contains two of Dalida's #1 hits, namely "Bang Bang" and "Mama", and her lover Luigi Tenco's "Ciao amore, ciao".

Track listing
 "Piccolo ragazzo"
 "Amo"
 "Bang Bang"
 "Stivaletti rossi"
 "Sola più che mai"
 "Mama"
 "Cuore matto"
 "Il mio male sei"
 "Ciao amore, ciao"
 "Pensiamoci ogni sera"
 "Cominciamo ad amarci"
 "Il silenzio"

References
 Dalida Official Website

External links
 Dalida Official Website "Discography" section

Dalida albums
1967 albums
Italian-language albums
Barclay (record label) albums
RCA Records albums